The 2002 Short Track Speed Skating World Cup was a multi-race tournament over a season for short track speed skating. The season began on 21 September and ended on 16 December 2001. The World Cup was organised by the ISU.

Men

Events

World Cup Rankings

Women

Events

World Cup Rankings

References 
Results

ISU Short Track Speed Skating World Cup
World Cup
World Cup